Jutta Leerdam (born 30 December 1998) is a Dutch speed skater specializing in the sprint events.

Career

Leerdam became the junior world champion at the 2017 World Junior Championships in Helsinki, Finland. The following year, at the 2018 Championships in Salt Lake City, United States, she finished second behind compatriot Joy Beune.

During the 2017–18 season, she won the ISU Junior World Cup competition in the 1000m and 1500m events. She also became the Dutch junior sprint champion.

In 2018, she turned professional and became a member of Team IKO.

Personal life
Leerdam was in a relationship with Dutch speed skater Koen Verweij beginning in 2017. On 1 August 2022, Leerdam announced on her Instagram page that they had broken up.

Records

Personal records

World record

Tournament overview

Source:

 Events for World Championship Junior Allround: 500m, 1500m, 1000m, 3000m
 Events for sprint championships: 500m, 1000m, 500m, 1000m

World Cup overview

References

External links

1998 births
Living people
Dutch female speed skaters
People from 's-Gravenzande
World Single Distances Speed Skating Championships medalists
World Sprint Speed Skating Championships medalists
Speed skaters at the 2022 Winter Olympics
Olympic speed skaters of the Netherlands
Medalists at the 2022 Winter Olympics
Olympic medalists in speed skating
Olympic silver medalists for the Netherlands
Sportspeople from South Holland
21st-century Dutch women